Catherine Helen Sachs née Cathee Dahmen (September 16, 1945 – November 25, 1997) was the first Native American supermodel in the 1960s and 1970s.

She was half German, half Chippewa and was born and raised in Minnesota.

Modeling career 
Dahmen left home at the age of 17 to live with her uncle, artist George Morrison, in Providence, Rhode Island. She was discovered in her late teens by The New York Times illustrator Antonio Lopez, who spotted her uncle's portrait of her and was ultimately responsible for her introduction into the fashion industry.

Dahmen spent her peak years with Ford Models, where she was one of the agency's top earners of the 1960s. She appeared on the covers of numerous fashion magazines including, Harper's Bazaar in 1968 and both UK Vogue and Italia in 1971 She was also associated with the Youthquake movement.

Family 
Dahmen grew up in South Minneapolis, Minnesota. In 1962, while still in high school, she gave birth to her first daughter, Veronica Rose Dahmen (now author Susan Fedorko) who at the age of 11 months—and without Dahmen's knowledge or consent—was placed up for adoption with the Smith family, by Dahmen's mother. Heartbreak associated with this incident precipitated Dahmen's relocation to Providence, Rhode Island. A 2009 Denver Post article revealed that this daughter had been adopted by a Minnesota family and only later discovered that her mother "became a supermodel in the 1970s and hung out with the likes of Mick Jagger and Andy Warhol."

After marrying young British actor Leonard Whiting, Dahmen moved to London, where she continued her career, modeling for Models 1. This marriage produced a daughter in 1972, Sarah Beth Whiting, who died in 2014, but not before reuniting with her half sister, author Susan Fedorko. Dahmen divorced Whiting in the late 1970s and entered her second marriage to singer Alan Merrill in 1977, she moved with him to New York from London, in 1980. Dahmen had by then two children with Merrill, daughter Laura Ann Sachs and son Allan Preston Sachs Jr. The couple later divorced and Merrill remarried.

Dahmen retired from modeling in 1980s and cause of death in 1997, was chronic obstructive pulmonary disease she was survived by her 3 children.

References

External links

Cathee Dahmen, Antonio Lopez and friends in 1966, New York Times Fashion & Style section

1945 births
1997 deaths
Female models from Minnesota
Ojibwe people
American people of German descent
Deaths from chronic obstructive pulmonary disease
American female models
20th-century American women
20th-century American people
20th-century Native American women
20th-century Native Americans